Ikel Lopez (born February 16, 1979) is an Aruban footballer. He formerly played for the Aruba national team.

National team statistics

References

1979 births
Living people
Aruban footballers
SV Estrella players
Association football defenders
Aruba international footballers